The 15th LG Cup began on 7 June 2010 and concluded on 23 February 2011. Piao Wenyao won the title, defeating compatriot Kong Jie in the final. 32 players from four countries competed in the final knockout tournament:
China (16): Chang Hao, Chen Yaoye, Gu Li, Hu Yaoyu, Jiang Weijie, Kong Jie, Lian Xiao, Meng Tailing, Niu Yutian, Peng Quan, Piao Wenyao, Shi Yue, Tuo Jiaxi, Wang Xi, Wang Yao, Zhou Ruiyang
Korea (11): An Choyoung, Choi Cheol-han, Heo Young-ho, Kim Jiseok, Lee Chang-ho, Lee Heesung, Lee Sedol, Mok Jin-seok, Paek Daehyun, Pak Yeong-hun, Park Junghwan
Japan (4): Iyama Yuta, Takao Shinji, Yamada Kimio, Yoda Norimoto
Taiwan (1): Xiao Zhenghao

Tournament

References

2011 in go
LG Cup (Go)